Jean-Baptiste Lafond (born 29 December 1961 in Bègles, France) is a former French rugby union footballer. He played for the French national team on over 30 occasions. His usual position was either on the wing or at fullback.

He made his debut for France against Australia in 1983 in Clermont Ferrand, which ended in a 15-all draw. He played in numerous Five Nations Championships, and was a part of the French squad at the 1991 Rugby World Cup.

At club level he played for teams including Paris clubs Racing Club de France and Stade Français. His club honours include winning the French championship in 1990 and was runner-up in 1987. His final cap for France was in Paris in 1993, with France defeating Wales. He was also selected for the English invitational side the Barbarian F.C.

References

External links
 Jean-Baptiste Lafond on sporting-heroes.net
 Scrum.com stats

1961 births
Living people
French rugby union players
Rugby union wings
Stade Français players
Barbarian F.C. players
France international rugby union players
People from Bègles
Sportspeople from Gironde
CA Bordeaux-Bègles Gironde players
RC Narbonne players
Racing 92 players